The Nógrád County Assembly is the local legislative body of Nógrád County in the Northern Hungary, in Hungary.

Composition

2019–2024 period
The Assembly elected at the 2019 local government elections, is made up of 15 counselors, with the following party composition:

After the elections in 2019 the Assembly controlled by the Fidesz–KDNP party alliance which has 10 councillors, versus 1 Democratic Coalition (DK), 1 Jobbik, 1 Momentum Movement, 1 Hungarian Socialist Party (MSZP), and 1 Our Homeland Movement (Mi Hazánk) councillors.

2014–2019 period
The Assembly elected at the 2014 local government elections, is made up of 15 counselors, with the following party composition:

After the elections in 2014 the Assembly controlled by the Fidesz–KDNP party alliance which has 9 councillors, versus 3 Jobbik, 2 Hungarian Socialist Party (MSZP) and 1 Democratic Coalition (DK) councillors.

2010–2014 period
The Assembly elected at the 2010 local government elections, is made up of 15 counselors, with the following party composition:

After the elections in 2010 the Assembly controlled by the Fidesz–KDNP party alliance which has 10 councillors, versus 3 Hungarian Socialist Party (MSZP) and 2 Jobbik councillors.

Presidents of the Assembly
So far, the presidents of the Nógrád County Assembly have been:

 1990–1994 Ferenc Korill, Alliance of Free Democrats (SZDSZ)
 1994–1998 Sándor Smitnya, Alliance of Free Democrats (SZDSZ)
 1998–2002 Zsolt Becsó, Fidesz–MKDSZ-MDNP
 2002–2006 Ottó Dóra, Hungarian Socialist Party (MSZP)
 2006–2014 Zsolt Becsó, Fidesz–KDNP
 since 2014 Nándor Skuczi, Fidesz–KDNP

References

Local government in Hungary

Nógrád County